The 1985 FIRS Intercontinental Cup was the first official edition of the roller hockey tournament known as the Intercontinental Cup (after two non official editions), played between the 23 and 25 of August, 1985. This second edition saw a drastic change in format, as the winner of the CERH European Cup played the winner of the Roller Hockey South American Club Championship, in a two-legged final. Unión Vecinal de Trinidad won the cup, defeating FC Barcelona.

Matches

See also
FIRS Intercontinental Cup

References 

FIRS Intercontinental Cup
1985 in roller hockey
1983 in Argentine sport
International roller hockey competitions hosted by Argentina